Sphaerocorynidae is a family of cnidarians belonging to the order Anthoathecata.

Genera:
 Astrocoryne Maggioni et al., 2017
 Heterocoryne Wedler & Larson, 1986
 Sphaerocoryne Pictet, 1893

References

Capitata
Cnidarian families